Greensleeves Rhythm Album #86: Ghetto Whiskey is an album in Greensleeves Records' rhythm album series.  It was released in November 2006 on CD and LP.  The album features various artists recorded over the "Ghetto Whiskey" riddim produced/created by Delly Ranx.

Track listing
"Ghetto Whiskey" - Delly Ranx & Chino
"Gunrise" - Mavado & Vybz Kartel
"Bung Bong" - Boysie & Not Nice
"All Day" - Craig Dennis
"Freeze" - T.O.K.
"Gangsta" - Delly Ranx
"Bruck It" - Vybz Kartel
"Formula" - Chino
"We Don't Take Bad Up" - Elephant Man
"How Will I Know" - Singing Sweet
"Wine Pon This" - Soltex 3000
"Mek It Beat" - Sizzla
"Highgrade Everyday" - Nitty Kutchie & Roundhead
"Mistake" - Wayne Wonder
"Rise The Machine" - Anthony B
"Who We Are" - Wayne Marshall
"Bere Sitten Sitten" - Tyrical
"Convince Me" - Shema
"Bad Mind" - Bramma
"Someone" - Mr. Easy
"For The Girl Dem" - Chukki Starr
"Protect Your Soul" - Norris Man
"I Will" - Turbulence
"Long Time" - Khari Jess
"War Monga" - Aidonia
"I'm Dangerous" - Mega Banton
"Ghetto Whiskey Rhythm" - Di Ranx & The Genious

Reggae compilation albums
2006 compilation albums